Delores Judith Taylor (September 27, 1932 – March 23, 2018) was an American film actor, screenwriter, and producer, known for her roles in the Billy Jack films of the 1970s.

Life and career
Taylor was born in 1932 in Winner, South Dakota, and grew up near the Rosebud Indian Reservation. Her father, Harry Taylor, was a postmaster, who ran a post office that was frequented by Native Americans. Her mother, Ann Nelson, was a homemaker.

She met actor Tom Laughlin while a student at the University of South Dakota in 1953, and married him while she was a graphic artist on October 15, 1954. They borrowed a car and moved to Los Angeles in 1955. They had three children: Frank, Teresa, and Christina. Her daughter Teresa is a fashion designer.

Together the couple developed the character of "Billy Jack", who first appeared in the 1967 film The Born Losers. They followed that with Billy Jack in 1971, then The Trial of Billy Jack in 1974, and Billy Jack Goes to Washington in 1976. Taylor and Laughlin played the starring roles in the latter three films. Taylor co-produced both The Born Losers and the 1975 film The Master Gunfighter.

She was nominated for a Golden Globe for New Star of the Year – Actress in 1972.

Death
Taylor died on March 23, 2018, of natural causes at the Motion Picture & Television Country House and Hospital in Los Angeles, California, aged 85.

Filmography

References

External links

Delores Taylor(Aveleyman)

1932 births
2018 deaths
20th-century American actresses
American film actresses
People from Tripp County, South Dakota
Actresses from South Dakota
University of South Dakota alumni
Deaths from dementia in California
21st-century American women